Photochromy is the art or process of reproducing colors by photography.[Note] Not to be confused with Photochromism (a reversible color change induced by light energy). See Photochromism. Furthermore, a Photochrom is  not the result of the photochromy process.

History 
Colored images by direct exposure from nature using a Lippmann plate

Color printing method by the bleach-out process.

Notes
In the original publication in 1891, Lippmann reports on photochromy in which he describes his famous method of photography in colors, the so-called "interference" method, based on the action of stationary waves.

References 

Photographic processes dating from the 19th century